Voka is a small borough in Toila Parish, Ida-Viru County in northeastern Estonia. As of 2011 Census, the settlement's population was 823, of which the Estonians were 687 (83.5%).

References

Villages in Ida-Viru County